Jesús María de Leizaola Sánchez (7 September 1896 in San Sebastian – 16 March 1989) was a Spanish politician and was named President of the Basque Government in exile after José Antonio Aguirre's death in 1960.

Early years (1896–1931)

Jesús María de Leizaola Sánchez was born to a wealthy family on Calle Getaria in San Sebastián on 7 September 1896. His parents were José Zacarías Leizaola and Cándida Sánchez. He was the third of seven children.
Leizola qualified in law at the University of Valladolid and in 1915 he began work for the government of Gipuzkoa, becoming exposed to nationalist politics. In 1919 he became head of the planning section for the Municipality of Bilbao where he joined the Basque Nationalist Party (EAJ-PNV). In 1922 he led a march calling for the creation of a Basque University in Gernika during which he was arrested along with the editor of Euzkadi. They were forced to march to Amorebieta before being freed. He rose up the ranks of Bilbao's city government before leaving in 1925 to take on the administration of the bankrupt Crédito de la Unión Minera and becoming more involved politically.

Second Spanish Republic (1931–37)
Leizaola was elected a member of Parliament in July 1931 in the Spanish Republic which existed from 1931 to 1939. Having returned to San Sebastian to resume his career in civil administration in 1933, he was one of the principal city officials who maintained order there and assisted in the evacuation when the Spanish Civil War broke out in 1936. He left his home town of San Sebastian in September 1936 and would not return for 40 years.

Leizaola assisted in the creation of the government of Aguirre in October 1936 and was named as regional minister for Justice and Culture.
In this role he acted for the Lehendakari and as a spokesman for the government, and ran the government's newspaper. He founded the Basque University in Bilbao he had protested for years before, although it only lasted a few months before the troops of Franco entered the city. Leizaola was responsible for attempting to organise the defence and then the evacuation of the city.

Exile and return (1937–89)
Going into exile in 1937, Leizaola transferred to Santander, then Barcelona. In 1939 he settled in Paris, where he worked to denounce the regime in Spain and keep his dream of freedom and Basque self-government alive. He was sworn in as Lehendakari at the funeral of Aguirre in 1960, but unlike his predecessor, he lacked a charisma enabling to garner the consensus of different political forces around him. In that respect, his office saw also the confirmation of Juan Ajuriaguerra's split with the young rising separatist movement ETA.

During the last years of Franco's regime in Spain, he was particularly active at the Vatican in calling for a restoration of democracy and autonomy. He was able to enter the Spanish Basque Country secretly in 1974 visiting Gernika and Bilbao. In 1979, after 43 years of exile, Leizaola came back home, helping set the grounds for a democratic regime and a Basque autonomy. He was welcomed at the San Mamés Stadium by thousands of people. The next day in a formal ceremony he symbolically transferred the role of Lehendakari to Carlos Garaikoetxea, democratically elected president of the Basque council. In 1980, he was elected to the Basque Parliament for the PNV, but retired from politics not long after.

He also combined politics with intellectual and literary concerns. A highly cultivated and learned man, Leizaola was the author of Basque Literature and Studies in Poetry. He married María del Coro Loidi Zulaica in 1924.

Leizaola's nephew, Joseba Leizaola, later served as the third President of the Basque Parliament from 1990 to 1998.

References

Sources

1896 births
1989 deaths
Basque history
Basque Nationalist Party politicians
Exiles of the Spanish Civil War in France
Leaders of political parties in Spain
Members of the 1st Basque Parliament
Members of the Congress of Deputies of the Second Spanish Republic
Politicians from San Sebastián
Presidents of the Basque Government
Spanish people of the Spanish Civil War (Republican faction)
Basque-language writers
University of Valladolid alumni